Epipremnum dahlii is a flowering plant belonging to the genus Epipremnum and family Araceae.

it is native to the Bismarck archipelago.

References 

dahlii